JJ Babu was a Thoroughbred gelding that excelled in the sport of eventing, under American rider Bruce Davidson.

JJ Babu was purchased by Davidson as a yearling. He was not only a good-looking horse, but was well-tempered. The gelding excelled in all three phases, which explains his success.

Partnered for 15 years with Davidson, the horse not only won the team gold at the 1984 LA Olympics, but also the Rolex Kentucky Three Day in 1983. He competed at the advanced level for nine seasons, and started in 12 CCIs.

JJ Babu was destroyed in April 1989 at the age of 15, after he fractured a pastern bone at the Fair Hill Horse Trials.

Competition Record
1988
 2nd Rolex Kentucky Three Day CCI*** (Lexington, KY)

1987
 1st Stockholm CCI *** (Sweden)
 1st Somborne

1986
 2nd Burghley Horse Trials CCI *** (England)
 1st Gatcombe Park
 6th Dauntsey Horse Trials
 6th Badminton Horse Trials CCIO *** (England)

1985
 11th Badminton CCIO ***
 2nd Brigstock

1984
 Team gold and individually 13th the Los Angeles Olympics

1983
 11th Burghley Horse Trials CCI***
 1st Rolex Kentucky Three Day CCI *** (Lexington, KY)

1982
 5th Dauntsey
 2nd Badminton Horse Trials CCI **** (England)
 1st Brigstock

1981
 1st Chesterland Three Day Event (Advanced)

1980
 1st Essex Three Day Event (Preliminary)

External links

Eventing horses
1974 animal births
1989 animal deaths
Horses in the Olympics